Jonas Erik Larholm (born 6 March 1982) plays for the Swedish national handball team and Ribe-Esbjerg HH. He was part of the Swedish team that won the silver medal at the 2012 Summer Olympics.

References

Swedish male handball players
1982 births
Living people
Handball players at the 2012 Summer Olympics
Olympic handball players of Sweden
Olympic silver medalists for Sweden
Olympic medalists in handball
Place of birth missing (living people)
Medalists at the 2012 Summer Olympics
Handball players from Gothenburg
21st-century Swedish people